Sergey Sergeevich Rodionov (born 29 July 1961 in Moscow), is a Russian publisher and banker. Founder and co-owner of holding "Rodionov Publishing House", its CEO.
The deputy chairman of the Central Bank of Russia (1991).

Early life

Born at July 29, 1961 in Moscow.

1978–1983: Moscow Institute of Finance (now Financial University under the Government of the Russian Federation) Kibalchicha str 1. Moscow. Faculty “International Economic Relations”. Diploma with honor of “Economist - Banking and foreign exchange operations”.

1983–1986: Postgraduate at the same Institute at the department for International Monetary Operations. Ph.D. in Economics for “Analysis of Monetary Theory and Policy of Federal Reserve System of USA”.

Career

1986–1988: Senior researcher in the Computer Centre of the Academy of Social Sciences, Moscow.

1988–1991:
 Head of Department of Scientific and Research centre of The State of The USSR (now Central Bank of Russia).
 Economic Adviser of The Chairman of the Board of The Central Bank of Russia.
 Director of the General Directorate of commercial banks of the Central Bank of Russia (registration, regulation, audit, control, compliance, payment system, forex, credits of all types - i.e. whole sphere of relations between Central bank and other credit institutes).
 Deputy Chairman of The Central Bank of Russia.

December 1991: Chairman of the board of the bank MENATEP. (later UKOS. Owner : Mikhail Khodorkovsky)

April 1992 – June 1998: Chairman, President of the Board of Imperial Bank. Chairman of Supervising Board - Rem Viakhirev, Vagit Alekperov
(other members of board- Andrey L. Kostin, Alexander Lebedev, Sergey Konstantinovich Dubinin From 1992 until 2000, Imperial Bank had a major stake in East-West United Bank (EWUB) (Luxembourg). On 6 July 1998, Sergey Rodionov resigned from Imperial.

1996–2010: President of the Diners Club company (Russia).

1993–2000: Chairman of the Board of East-West United bank, Luxembourg with 49% owned by Imperial bank. For over five years – 2000 to 2005 – all stocks of the Russian Foreign Banks were being purchased from the Bank of Russia by VTB Bank. Andrey Kostin and Vladimir Stolyarenko were at Imperial bank from 1993 to 1998 when Stolyarenko transferred to Tokobank which held a 28% stake in East-West United Bank in 1998. Imperial focused on oil and natural gas supplies to East Germany and later to Germany including the oil-for-pipes program.

From 1996 Chairman of the board of Rodionov Publishing House (Russia).

2000–2001 - Member of the board of EWUB Luxembourg

From 2001 CEO of Domus Participation Sarl Luxembourg (real estate company).

Notes

References

1961 births
Living people
Businesspeople from Moscow
Russian bankers
Financial University under the Government of the Russian Federation alumni
Soviet bankers